Grahm is a surname. Notable people with the surname include:

Andréas Grahm (born 1987), Swedish footballer
Erika Grahm (born 1991), Swedish ice hockey player

See also
Grahm Junior College, a defunct junior college in Boston, Massachusetts, United States
Graham (disambiguation)